Ian Watkins may refer to:

 Ian Watkins (Lostprophets singer) (born 1977), convicted sex offender and former lead singer of Welsh rock band Lostprophets
 Ian Watkins (rugby union) (born 1963), Wales international rugby player
 Ian "H" Watkins (born 1976), Welsh performer, member of pop group Steps

See also 
 Ian Watkin (1940–2016), New Zealand actor known for the films Braindead and Sleeping Dogs